The 2002–03 Israeli Noar Leumit League was the 9th season since its introduction in 1994 as the top-tier football in Israel for teenagers between the ages 18–20.

Maccabi Haifa won the title, whilst Hapoel Petah Tikva and Ironi Nir Ramat HaSharon were relegated.

Final table

External links
Noar Premier League 02-03 One.co.il 

Israeli Noar Premier League seasons
Youth